Erika Komura (born 5 August 1982) is a Japanese synchronized swimmer who competed in the 2008 Summer Olympics.

References

1982 births
Living people
Japanese synchronized swimmers
Olympic synchronized swimmers of Japan
Synchronized swimmers at the 2008 Summer Olympics
Asian Games medalists in artistic swimming
Artistic swimmers at the 2006 Asian Games
Asian Games silver medalists for Japan
Medalists at the 2006 Asian Games